Saccharopolyspora rosea is a bacterium from the genus Saccharopolyspora which has been isolated from bronchial lavage from a patient in Aachen in Germany.

References

 

Pseudonocardineae
Bacteria described in 2009